Upkankul (Upqankül) is a rural locality (a village) in Yevbulyaksky Selsoviet, Askinsky District, Bashkortostan, Russia. The population was 404 as of 2010. There are 10 streets.

Geography 
Upkankul is located 21 km south of Askino (the district's administrative centre) by road. Itkuli is the nearest rural locality.

References 

Rural localities in Askinsky District